New York City's piers have served an important role in the city's history. They historically served industrial purposes and as the main reception area for immigrants to the city, but many have been converted into public parks with deindustrialization.

History
New York City's piers and wharves were the most valuable assets of the New York City government in the 1860s, worth almost $15.8 million without any repairs in 1867. Nevertheless, by that time they had been in such a poor state of repair as to drive steamboat companies to other nearby cities such as Hoboken and Jersey City. Money to maintain them was appropriated by the New York State Legislature in 1866, but such money failed to receive the approval of the Governor, leaving no money for such repairs. At the beginning of 1867 $100,000 of rent owed to the city from the piers and other port structures was withheld due to the city's negligence in keeping those structures in good repair. A report ordered by the city government subsequent to such development found that several of the piers owned by the city had been claimed to be under private ownership.

Manhattan's Hudson River waterfront had become deindustrialized and derelict by the 1980s. The Hudson River Park, which would later subsume several of the piers on the Hudson River, was established in 1998.

List of piers

References

Works cited